Kasinadhuni Viswanath (19 February 1930 – 2 February 2023) was an Indian film director, screenwriter and actor. One of the greatest auteurs of Telugu cinema, he received international recognition for his works, and is known for blending parallel cinema with mainstream cinema. He was honored with the "Prize of the Public" at the "Besançon Film Festival of France" in 1981. In 1992, he received the Andhra Pradesh state Raghupathi Venkaiah Award, and the civilian honor Padma Shri for his contribution to the field of arts. In 2017, he was conferred with the Dadasaheb Phalke Award, the highest award in Cinema of India. 

Viswanath started his film career as an audiographer and in sixty years, he has directed 53 feature films in a variety of genres, including central themes based on performing arts, visual arts, aesthetics, melodrama, and poetry. Viswanath's filmography is known for addressing the issues of caste, colour, disability, gender discrimination, misogyny, alcoholism and socio-economic challenges through liberal arts medium.

Viswanath's classic blockbusters Sankarabharanam (1980) and Sagara Sangamam (1983) were featured among CNN-IBN's 100 greatest Indian films of all time. His directorial works Sankarabharanam and Saptapadi (1981) fetched the National Film Awards for Best Popular Feature Film and Best Feature Film on National Integration, respectively. Sankarabharanam, was featured at the 8th IFFI, the Tashkent Film Festival, the Moscow International Film Festival, and the Besançon Film Festival.

Viswanath's Swathi Muthyam (1986) was India's official entry to the 59th Academy Awards. Swathi Muthyam, Sagara Sangamam and Sirivennela (1986), were featured at the Asia-Pacific Film Festival. Swayamkrushi (1987) was screened to special mention at the Moscow International Film Festival. Sankarabharanam, Sagara Sangamam, Sruthilayalu (1987), Swarnakamalam (1988), and Swathi Kiranam (1992) were featured in the Indian Panorama sections of IFFI, Ann Arbor Film Festival, and AISFM Film Festival respectively.

Viswanath is a recipient of five National Film Awards, seven state Nandi Awards, ten Filmfare Awards South, and a Filmfare Award in Hindi. His directorial works which are produced by Poornodaya Movie Creations were screened to special mention at the Moscow International Film Festival; such films were dubbed into Russian language and have been theatrically released in Moscow.

Early life 
Kasinadhuni Viswanath was born on 19 February 1930 in Repalle of Guntur district, Andhra Pradesh. His parents are Kasinadhuni Subramanyam and Kasinadhuni Saraswathy (Saraswathamma) and his ancestral roots come from Pedapulivarru, Andhra Pradesh, a small village on the banks of River Krishna. Kasinadhuni is his family name, Viswanath is his given name. Viswanath studied Intermediate from Guntur Hindu College, and holds a BSc degree from Andhra Christian College of Andhra University. He began his career as a sound recordist at Vauhini Studios in Madras, where his father was an associate. There, he apprenticed under the guidance of A Krishnan, who was the Head of Sound Engineering at Vauhini. Viswanath and A Krishnan developed a close rapport and later after the former made the transition into film direction, he would always bounce ideas off the latter.  Viswanath made his entry into film direction at Annapurna Pictures under Adurthi Subba Rao and K. Ramnoth. He wished to work as an assistant to director K. Balachander and Bapu.

Career 
During his early career, Viswanath was associated with Adurthi Subba Rao on National Award-winning films such as Mooga Manasulu (1964) and Doctor Chakravarty (1964). Viswanath scripted Sudigundalu (1968), and directed works such as Aatma Gowravam (1965), O Seeta Katha (1974) and Jeevana Jyothi (1975) which garnered the state Nandi Awards, and were screened at the Asian and African film Festival at Tashkent.

In 1951 he started as an assistant director in the Telugu-Tamil Film Pathala Bhairavi. In 1965, Viswanath debuted as a director with Telugu film Aatma Gowravam, which won the Nandi Award for Best Feature Film of the year. Viswanath followed it up with drama films Chelleli Kapuram (1971), Sarada (1973), O Seeta Katha (1974) and Jeevana Jyoti (1975) which are women-centric films. It was in Siri Siri Muvva (1976) that the artistic touch in his craft first became visible.

Sankarabharanam (1980) highlights the neglect of traditional Indian music under the increasing influence of western music. The film brings out the grandeur of Carnatic music, the traditional South Indian music towards the end. Bhaskaran, a media and film researcher from Chennai has documented, in his study of South Indian music culture, how Sankarabharanam contributed to the revival of Carnatic music in a big way. The film broke many commercial records by running for over one year in cinemas. In a recent study published in Journal of Dance, Movements & Spiritualities published by "Intellect Group" of the United Kingdom, C. S. H. N. Murthy, a media and film studies scholar from India, has demonstrated how Viswanath's filmography embraces a wide spectrum of characters that include mentally and physically challenged subjects as well, like the film Sarada (1973), which exploits a psychologically deranged woman, Swathi Muthyam (1986), which exploits an autistic man's humanism, Sirivennela (1986) which revels in situations between deaf and dumb characters, and Kalam Marindi (1972), which dwells on characters stuck in a caste-based society.

Film researcher, C. S. H. N. Murthy observed that Viswanath's films offer a pathway towards inclusiveness, affecting positive spiritual change at both personal and social levels. Situating the content in the broad arena of de-westernizing media studies, through immersive and culturally embedded perspectives, Murthy endeavoured to offer modern and postmodern dimensions in Viswanath's films.

Films with social issues 
Viswanath has made many films dealing with a wide range of human and social issues: Saptapadi, Sirivennela, Sutradharulu, Subhalekha, Sruthilayalu, Subha Sankalpam, Aapadbandhavudu, Swayam Krushi, and Swarnakamalam have lead characters representing different strata of society, meticulously etched to suit the larger picture.

In Saptapadi, he decries the evils of untouchability and the caste system. In Subhodayam and Swayam Krushi he emphasizes the dignity and respectability of manual labor. In Subhalekha, he deals, in a humorous way, with the dowry system – one of the major evils in today's society. While Sutradharulu urges present-day society to recognize the need to adopt the ideals of non-violence, Swati Kiranam depicts the harm that can be caused by the basic instincts of envy and anger in a man, however accomplished he may be.

In spite of the nature of these subjects, they are presented in a subtle manner with an imaginative storyline, with just the right amount of emphasis on the intended message. Yet Viswanath's films were never offbeat cinema, but wholesome entertainers those elevated the lead actors' image. He is a director with social-conscious mind and who believes cinema can bring out desirable changes in society if presented in a format liked by a cross-section of audience.

Association with Poornodaya Creations 
Edida Nageswara Rao founded "Poornodaya Movie Creations", which encouraged Viswanath to make aesthetic films. Poornodaya has produced several of Viswanath's films like Sankarabharanam, Swatimutyam, Saagarasangamam, Sutradharulu, and Aapadbandhavudu. Most of these films were dubbed into Russian and were screened at the Moscow Film Festival.

Hindi cinema 
Viswanath has also directed Hindi language films such as Sargam (1979), Kaamchor (1982),  Shubh Kaamna (1983), Jaag Utha Insan (1984), Sur Sangam (1985), Sanjog (1985), Eeshwar (1989), Sangeet (1992) and Dhanwan (1993). Some of these films (especially his collaboration with actress Jaya Prada) have been super hits at the box office.

Acting 
In 1995, Viswanath debuted as an actor with Telugu film Subha Sankalpam. As a character actor, he has appeared in works such as Vajram (1995), Kalisundam Raa (2000), Narasimha Naidu (2001), Nuvvu Leka Nenu Lenu (2002), Santosham (2002), Seema Simham (2002), Tagore (2003), Lakshmi Narasimha (2004), Swarabhishekam (2004), Aadavari Matalaku Arthale Verule (2007), Athadu (2005), and Pandurangadu (2008), and Devasthanam (2012). He essayed characters in Tamil works such as Kuruthipunal (1995), Mugavaree (1999), Kakkai Siraginilae (2000), Bagavathi (2002), Pudhiya Geethai (2003), Yaaradi Nee Mohini (2008), Rajapattai (2011), Singam II (2013), Lingaa (2014) and Uttama Villain (2015).

Television 
Viswanath had also acted on a few television serials; Siva Narayana Teertha on SVBC TV, Chellamay on Sun TV, and Suryiavamsam on Vendhar TV. He also endorses brands such as GRT Jewellers and appears in various television commercials.

Biopic 
Viswadarshanam is an official biopic of K Viswanath, written and directed by Janardhana Maharshi which tells the story of a 90-year-old golden director in the 100 years of the silver screen.
The film was aired on ETV (Telugu) on February 19, 2023 marking his birthday.

Personal life and death 
Viswanath was married to Kasinadhuni Jayalakshmi. Actor Chandra Mohan, singer S. P. Balasubrahmanyam and singer S. P. Sailaja are his cousins.

Viswanath died on 2 February 2023, at the age of 92 in Hyderabad.

Filmography

Viswanath has directed 53 feature films

As Character Actor

Other roles

Awards 

Civilian honour
 Padma Shri (1992), Government of India

International honours
 1981 – Prize of the Public at the Besançon Film Festival of France
 1982–87 – Special Mention – Moscow International Film Festival
 2014 – Gulf Andhra Award for Life Time Achievement in Cinema – U.A.E.

National Film Awards
 2017 – Dadasaheb Phalke Award for lifetime achievement in cinema.
 1980 – National Film Award for Best Popular Film Providing Wholesome Entertainment – Sankarabharanam
 1982 – Nargis Dutt Award for Best Feature Film on National Integration – Saptapadi
 1987 – Best Feature Film in Telugu – Swathi Muthyam
 1990 – Best Feature Film in Telugu – Sutradharulu
 2005 – Best Feature Film in Telugu – Swarabhishekam

Nandi Awards
 1980: Second Best Story Writer - Sankarabharanam
 1981: Best Screenplay Writer – Saptapadi
 1982: Best Story Writer - Subhalekha
 1986: Best Director – Swathi Muthyam
 1987: Best Director – Sruthilayalu
 1992: Raghupathi Venkaiah Award – Lifetime achievement for outstanding contributions to Telugu cinema
 1995: Best Character Actor – Subha Sankalpam
 2000: Best Supporting Actor – Kalisundam Raa

Cinema Express Awards
 1988: Cinema Express Award for Best Director – Swarnakamalam

CineMAA Awards
 CineMAA Award for lifetime achievement – (2008)

South Indian International Movie Awards
 2021: Lifetime Achievement Award

Filmfare Awards
 1989: Filmfare Best Story Award – Eeshwar

Filmfare Awards South

 1974: Best Director – O Seeta Katha
 1975: Best Director – Jeevana Jyoti
 1982: Best Director – Subhalekha
 1983: Best Director – Sagara Sangamam
 1986: Best Director – Swathi Muthyam
 1987: Best Director – Sruthilayalu
 1992: Best Director – Aapadbandhavudu
 1995: Best Director – Subha Sankalpam
 1994: Lifetime Achievement

Honorary doctorate
 Potti Sreeramulu Telugu University

Other honours 
 2012 – Viswa Vikhyata Darsaka Sarvabhowma for achievement in direction.
 2012 – Chittoor V. Nagayya Puraskaram for lifetime achievement in cinema.
 2017 – Film Nagar Cultural Center – Hyderabad Award for achievement in cinema.
 2017 – Telugu Film Director's Association Award for achievement in direction.
 2017 – Aathmeeya Sanmanam from Government of Andhra Pradesh for achievement in cinema at Vijayawada Thummalapalli Kalakshetram.

Notes

References

External links 

 

1930 births
2023 deaths
People from Guntur
Telugu film directors
Film directors from Andhra Pradesh
Indian male screenwriters
Hindi-language film directors
Male actors in Telugu cinema
Indian male film actors
Male actors in Tamil cinema
Indian male television actors
Recipients of the Padma Shri in arts
Filmfare Awards winners
Filmfare Awards South winners
Nandi Award winners
Dadasaheb Phalke Award recipients
Male actors from Andhra Pradesh
20th-century Indian male actors
20th-century Indian film directors
Male actors in Hindi cinema
Directors who won the Best Popular Film Providing Wholesome Entertainment National Film Award
Directors who won the Best Film on National Integration National Film Award
South Indian International Movie Awards winners